D4, D.IV, d4 or variants may refer to:

Science and medicine
 22-Dihydroergocalciferol, vitamin D4
 D4-isoprostane, a type of isoprostane
 ATC code D04, Antipruritics, including antihistamines, anesthetics, etc., a subgroup of the Anatomical Therapeutic Chemical Classification System
 D04, Carcinoma in situ of skin ICD-10 code
 Dopamine receptor D4, a human gene
 Octamethylcyclotetrasiloxane, called D4

Mathematics
 Dihedral group of order 4, otherwise known as the Klein four-group
 Dihedral group of order 8, the symmetry group of a regular 4-gon
 D4 (root system)

Technology and computing
 D4 (programming language), a programming language of the Dataphor system
 D4 video connector, a type of analog video connector found on Japanese consumer electronics
 D4 framing standard, a framing standard for traditional time-division multiplexing

Aircraft
 Albatros D.IV, a World War I experimental German fighter aircraft
 Auster D.4, a 1960 two-seat British light aircraft
 Dewoitine D.4, a Dewoitine aircraft
 Dunne D.4, a 1907 British experimental aircraft
 Fokker D.IV, a World War I German fighter biplane
 LFG Roland D.VI, an aircraft powered by the German Mercedes D.III engine
 Phönix D.IV, a KuKLFT D-class designation aircraft
 Schütte-Lanz D.IV, a 1917 German fighter prototype aircraft
 Siemens-Schuckert D.IV, a 1918 German fighter aircraft

Transport

Rail 
 Bavarian D IV, an 1878 German tank locomotive model
 Bavarian D IV (Ostbahn), an 1867 German steam locomotive model
 D4, the tank engine variant of the Victorian Railways Dd class locomotive in Australia
 GSWRI Class D4, a Great Southern and Western Railway Irish steam locomotive
 LNER Class D4, a class of British steam locomotives 
 PRR D4, an 1873 American steam locomotive model
 SP&S Class D-4, a Spokane, Portland and Seattle Railway locomotive

Road 
 D4 motorway (Czech Republic), a motorway in the Czech Republic
 D4 motorway (Slovakia), a motorway in Slovakia

Engines
 Mercedes D.IV, a World War I German 8-cylinder, liquid-cooled inline aircraft engine
 Mercedes D.IVa, a 1917 German 6-cylinder, water-cooled, inline aircraft engine

Media and entertainment
 The D4, a rock band from Auckland, New Zealand
 D4 Princess, a 1999 Japanese manga series
 D4: Dark Dreams Don't Die, a video game by Hidetaka Suehiro for the Xbox One and PC
 D4 (film), by Darrin Dickerson
 D4 - Get Up and Dance, an Indian dance fiction television series
 Diablo IV, an upcoming action role-playing game by Blizzard Entertainment
 Dillinger Four, a punk rock band from Minneapolis, Minnesota

Other uses
 Nikon D4, a flagship DSLR from Nikon
 Caterpillar D4 a small crawler type tractor built by Caterpillar Inc.
 , a 1949 Australian Navy destroyer
 , a 1911 British  submarine
 Motorway D4 (Slovakia), a motorway in southwestern Slovakia
 Peugeot D4, a French van sold between 1955 and 1965
 Dublin 4, a Dublin postcode
 d4, a 4-sided die
 d4, the second most popular opening move in chess; begins the Queen's Pawn Game
 D4, IATA code for Alidaunia airline
 D4, commonly used jargon by fans for Ddu-Du Ddu-Du, a song produced by K-Pop group Blackpink.

See also
 4D (disambiguation)
 Div (disambiguation)